Jairo Daniel González Fajardo (born 27 February 1992) is a Mexican professional footballer who plays as a full-back.

Club career

Youth
Jairo was formed in his hometown with C.D. Guadalajara. He joined Chivas San Rafael in 2008 and played his whole youth career with the club.

U. de G.
Jairo was loaned out to U. de G. after playing with Guadalajara's under 20s. After the team managed promotion to Liga MX, they bought Jairo's rights along with Hector Reynoso.

UANL
After the relegation of Leones Negros, González signed a 6-month loan with Tigres UANL.

Sinaloa
On 17 December 2015, Dorados de Sinaloa agreed to sign González on loan from Club Universidad de Guadalajara. In May 2016, Dorados were relegated to the Ascenso MX, been the second time in two years that González lost the category with two different teams, he then returned to Leones Negros after his loan expired with Dorados de Sinaloa.

Necaxa
In June 2016, Necaxa signed González on loan from Club Universidad de Guadalajara.

Honours
Necaxa
Copa MX: Clausura 2018

References

External links

Jairo Gonzalez at Ex-Chivas in Necaxa 
Jairo Gonzalez at Club Necaxa 

1992 births
Living people
Tigres UANL footballers
Leones Negros UdeG footballers
Dorados de Sinaloa footballers
Club Necaxa footballers
Lobos BUAP footballers
Liga MX players
Footballers from Guadalajara, Jalisco
Mexican footballers
Association football fullbacks